Suurupi is a village in Harku Parish, Harju County in northern Estonia. It has a population of 1180 (as of 1 December 2019).

Suurupiis the birthplace of Estonian artist August Albo (1893–1963). 
There are two range lights located in Suurupi, Suurupi Rear Lighthouse and Suurupi Front Lighthouse.

Gallery

References

Villages in Harju County